Los Llanitos is a corregimiento in San Carlos District, Panamá Oeste Province, Panama with a population of 3,264 as of 2010. Its population as of 1990 was 2,370; its population as of 2000 was 2,708.

References

Corregimientos of Panamá Oeste Province